The 2008–09 Champions Hockey League was the only season of the Champions Hockey League (2008–09), an IIHF-organized ice hockey tournament for the best club teams in Europe. 
The season was played with 12 teams from seven countries (two teams each from Russia, Czech Republic, Sweden and Finland,
one team each from Switzerland, Germany and Slovakia and a 12th team from one of these three countries, determined in a qualification tournament).
Every participating team was guaranteed an appearance fee of 300,000 euro and the winner received 1,000,000 euro. Prize money was also be awarded for winning group stage matches (50,000 euro), for the semi-final appearance (200,000 euro) and for the other finalist (500,000 euro).
In total, 10 million euros were distributed, the largest prize sum ever in a European hockey club competition.

The ZSC Lions from Switzerland won the competition by beating Russia's Metallurg Magnitogorsk in the finals.

In December 2013, the IIHF officially announced that they had launched a new tournament with the same name, born out of the European Trophy, starting in the 2014–15 season.

Participating teams
The 2008–09 edition of the Champions Hockey League is played with twelve teams from Europe's top seven hockey leagues. Ten teams qualified directly for the group stage due to their performances in the domestic leagues. The field was completed with the winner of last season's Champions Cup and one team from the qualifying tournament. The tables below lists these teams together with the reasons for qualifying.

Directly qualified for group stage

Note: Because the Swedish regular-season winner (HV71) also won the play-offs, Linköpings HC as the runner-up of the regular-season will participate.

Participating in qualifying tournament

Note: Because the Slovak regular-season winner (Slovan Bratislava) also won the play-offs, HC Košice as the runner-up of the regular-season can participate in the qualifying tournament.

Qualifying tournament

Three teams played a qualifying tournament on 12–14 September in Nuremberg, Germany. A win was awarded 3 points, 0 points for a loss.
SC Bern won the tournament and qualified as the second team from Switzerland for the group stage of the Champions Hockey League. Bern's Ramzi Abid was the top scorer of the tournament with 3 goals and 1 assist. The matches were attended by an average of 3,426 spectators.

Group stage

The draw for the group stage took place on Friday, 25 April 2008 in Zürich, Switzerland. The twelve teams were drawn into groups of three. Each group played a double round-robin. If the games were decided after 60 minutes, the winner was awarded 3 points and the loser 0 points. In case of a tie, both teams got 1 point and a penalty shoot-out was staged with the winner being awarded a second point. The best team of each group – the two Russian teams Ufa and Magnitogorsk, Espoo from Finland and the ZSC Lions from Switzerland – advanced to the semi-finals.

Group A
Eisbären Berlin played their two home games at the new O2 World in Berlin in front of 13,000 and 13,500 spectators, respectively, a Champions Hockey League record. Magnitogorsk qualified for the semi-finals on gameday 5 after winning their first three games. Metallurg's Jan Marek was the top scorer in group A with 2 goals and 5 assists.

Group B

Espoo won all 4 of their games and qualified for the semi-final after gameday 5. The top scorer in group B was Bern's Christian Dubé with 5 goals (and 0 assists).

Group C
Salavat Yulaev was the first team of the 2008–09 Champions Hockey League to qualify for the semi-finals after winning their first three games. The top scorer in group C was Ufa's Alexander Radulov with 1 goal and 4 assists.

Group D

The winner of group D was not decided until the final game in Prague between Slavia and the ZSC Lions. In front of 8,137 spectators, the Lions won the game 5–1 after scoring 4 goals in the last period. The group's top scorer (and the leading scorer after all group stage games) was Adrian Wichser from ZSC with 9 assists (and 0 goals).

Knockout round

Semi-finals

The semi-finals were played as two-legged matches. If a game was tied after 60 minutes, it would have been counted as a tie, without a penalty shoot-out taking place. Only if after two games the teams were level on points (i.e. one win each or two ties), a penalty shoot-out was staged to determine the series winner Home ice advantage of the second game went to the teams with the better records in the group stage.

First Semi-final
Because both teams from Russia qualified for the semi-finals, they had to play against each other according to the tournament regulations. Salavat Yulaev won the first game in Magnitogorsk with goaltender Alexandr Eremenko stopping 36 shots. The second game in Ufa, however, was won by Metallurg. Therefore, a penalty shoot-out was staged to determine the series winner, which was won 2–0 by Magnitogorsk.

Second Semi-final
Because the Hallenstadion in Zürich, the home arena of the ZSC Lions, was not available on the semi-final dates, the Lions were forced to play their home game at the Diners Club Arena in Rapperswil-Jona, about 25 km away from Zurich. The ZSC Lions won both their "home" game and the game in Espoo, where they were accompanied by about 600 fans from Switzerland.

Finals

The final was also played as a two-legged match.  Home ice advantage of the second game went to the ZSC Lions which had the better record in the group stage. As in the semi-finals, the Lions were forced to play their home game in Rapperswil in an arena with only half the capacity of the Hallenstadion in Zürich. The game in the Diners Club Arena was sold out within 30 minutes, leaving many fans without a ticket for the most important game in their club's history.

The ZSC Lions became the first-ever Swiss team to win a major European club competition by winning the Champions Hockey League. After a 2–2 draw in Magnitogorsk, the ZSC Lions won the return game against Metallurg Magnitogorsk 5–0 to dethrone the 2008 European club champion. ZSC goaltender Ari Sulander was named Champions Hockey League MVP and was the first to hoist the Silver Stone Trophy.

Statistics

Scoring leaders 
List shows the top skaters sorted by points, then goals. If the list exceeds 5 skaters because of a tie in points, all of the tied skaters are shown.

GP = Games played; G = Goals; A = Assists; Pts = Points; +/− = Plus/minus; PIM = Penalties In MinutesSource: IIHF.com

Leading goaltenders 
Only the top five goaltenders, based on save percentage, who have played 40% of their team's minutes are included in this list.

TOI = Time on ice (minutes:seconds); SA = Shots against; GA = Goals against; GAA = Goals against average; Sv% = Save percentage; SO = ShutoutsSource: IIHF.com

References

External links
 Google Maps – participating teams

Champions Hockey League (2008–09)
1